General Wade Eiling, sometimes known as The General, is a fictional character appearing in American comic books published by DC Comics.

Publication history
Wade Eiling first appeared in Captain Atom #1 (March 1987) and was created by Cary Bates and Pat Broderick.

Fictional character biography
Wade Eiling is a military tactician who blackmails the accused Nathaniel Adam into participating in the atomic experiment that turns Nathaniel into the nuclear being Captain Atom, and causes Adam to disappear for 18 years. This is considered a failure by Eiling and Heinrich Megala, the project's main scientist. They would attempt the experiment again, which ends up with the creation of Major Force.

During the 18 years in which Adam is gone, Eiling marries Adam's wife and acts as father to his two children. Eiling also manipulates Captain Atom into serving the military. His first attempts, a chance for Adam to view his children in exchange for retrieving a lost submarine, falls apart in issue #3 of the 1980s Captain Atom series. This embarrasses Eiling in front of his superiors. The same issue details the cover story for Captain Atom that Eiling helps create, one that is, in his words, "a scenario just far-fetched and hokey enough to sound authentic". His continuing conflicts with the title character were a major focus of the 1980s Captain Atom series. Eiling would also form an intensely adversarial relationship with Megala.

General Wade Eiling makes a cameo appearance in SoftWar, the very first story arc of 1993 maxi-series The Hacker Files.

In JLA #24 after being diagnosed with an inoperable brain tumor, Eiling sends a military team to salvage the indestructible body of a Shaggy Man from the Pacific Ocean where he has its body shaved. Green Lantern and Aquaman attempt to stop the Corps from retrieving the body, but their efforts are thwarted.

The General returns to his base of operations, Threshold. From there he orchestrates a military assault on the JLA. Answering a call for help in Phoenix, Arizona, the Justice League are attacked by American military forces. Spearheading the offensive is a new superhero team called the Ultramarine Corps. Recruited and genetically enhanced by Eiling's lab team, The Ultramarines already exhibit signs of terminal illness. Meanwhile, Batman, the Huntress and Plastic Man track Eling to Threshold, where they discover that Eiling transferred his brain patterns into the indestructible body of the Shaggy Man and called this form the General.

The JLA battle the military and the Corps until JLA #26 (February 1999). General's forces consider mutiny as doubts against attacking the League come to a head. Superman, whose super-senses have diagnosed the Ultramarine's disease, persuades the Ultramarine Corps that General has used and betrayed them. The Corps members, who volunteered for service in good faith, switch sides and speed with the JLA toward Threshold.

Even against the combined might of the JLA and the Ultramarines, the General is unstoppable. Batman notices that General's tactical edge and focus are diminished in his new artificial form. Working together, the team fights the monster onto a bulk-matter teleport platform. General is transported to 433 Eros, a 'rocky needle', six miles in length, at the heart of the Sol system's asteroid belt.

He stays there for several months until Queen Bee recruits him into Lex Luthor's new Injustice Gang. General battles against the Justice League a second time as part of a coordinated attack, this time utilizing a large-scale machine gun. He declares that the League was wrong to banish him to the asteroid with no trial. The battle moves to one of the White Martian warships that is currently inside the Phantom Zone. There, General states his plan to utilize the weapons of mass destruction on Earth itself. Orion's war dog Sturmer participates in a trick against General. The canine tackles the man through a ship's airlock, into the Phantom Zone. This naturally distresses Superman, but Orion assures him that Sturmer has willingly made this choice.

Having somehow escaped, he has since appeared in the JSA comics fighting Hal Jordan. During the Infinite Crisis storyline, General is one of the hundreds of villains recruited into the Society. He is a participant in the Battle of Metropolis, the first step of the Society's war on the heroes. This effort fails. Later, he is recruited into the Suicide Squad, where his regenerative powers are significantly diminished. He betrays the team to their intended target. Rick Flag detonates a bomb implanted in General's head, ending the threat. His head and brain eventually regenerate, but results in some amnesia. General continues to serve as a Squad member through the "Salvation Run" storyline. This is the name for a program that exiles supervillains to a distant, Earth-like planet without a trial.

In September 2011, DC Comics engaged in a line-wide revision of its superhero comics, including their stories and characters' fictional histories, known as The New 52. In the new stories, the character of Captain Atom has a new origin with General Wade Eiling first appearing in a radiation suit while flanking Captain Atom. General Eiling tells Captain Atom to fall in line as he is a super-weapon that will keep America on the top. When Captain Atom tells them that he will be just another atomic bomb for them, General Eiling attempts to quarantine Captain Atom. While stating that he cannot eat or drink, Captain Atom counters everything that the military throws at him.

Powers and abilities
General Wade Eiling specializes in military warfare. In a shaved body of Shaggy Man that he dubs the General, Eiling has enough raw strength to engage multiple Justice League members in close combat, including powerhouses such as Steel, Orion, Martian Manhunter, and Superman. As an artificial lifeform, he can rapidly regrow lost limbs (even after they were blasted off by Superman's heat vision). Wade could smell the adrenaline in Batman's sweat, especially during their battle. The General was nearly invulnerable to extreme temperatures, high pressures, and the vacuum of space. Despite his massive frame, he was able to run much faster than others. He is functionally immortal and does not require food, water, or sleep. His vulnerability to hypnosis can be a disadvantage.

Other versions

JLA/Avengers
The General is among the mind-controlled villains defending Krona's stronghold when the heroes assault it. He is defeated by Iron Man and Vision.

In other media

Television
 General Wade Eiling appears in Justice League Unlimited, voiced by J. K. Simmons. This version is an Air Force General and member of Project Cadmus who regards metahumans as a threat to humanity. Following Cadmus' disbandment, he is relegated to a "pencil pusher". Upon learning that his former superior Amanda Waller no longer believes the Justice League is a threat, a displeased Eiling injects himself with Captain Nazi's super-soldier serum and transforms into a monster. He attempts to find Superman, but is opposed by non-powered Leaguers Green Arrow, Speedy, Shining Knight, Crimson Avenger, Vigilante, Stargirl, and S.T.R.I.P.E. instead. While he soundly defeats them, a group of civilians stand between him and Shining Knight, causing Eiling to realize he was the only metahuman involved in the fight and became what he hates. He abandons the battle, but vows to return if the Justice League becomes a threat.
 General Wade Eiling appears in the Young Justice episode "Cornered", voiced by Jeff Bennett.
 General Wade Eiling appears in The Flash, portrayed by Clancy Brown. This version is a U.S. Army major general who worked with S.T.A.R. Labs five years prior to the series to develop a means of creating psychic interrogators until Harrison Wells learned he was abusing the program's test subject Grodd and broke ties with him.

Video games
General Wade Eiling as the General appears in the Nintendo DS version of Justice League Heroes.

Miscellaneous
General Wade Eiling appears in issue #5 of the Justice League Unlimited spin-off comic book.

Reception and analysis
The Slings & Arrows Comic Guide found that in the character of General Wade Eiling the comic had created "an appalling specimen of military pigheadedness who can justify every iniquitous piece of behaviour under the blanket of national security". The Supervillain Book summed up Eiling's character as an "immoral soldier".

According to George A. Gonzalez, in the figure of General Eiling the creators of Justice League Unlimited represent the negative side of "aggressive military policies of the 2000s" by the US government, like "wanton violence" and "fixation on 'power' (i.e. military force)". Through his deliberate transformation into "a huge, hideous, grayish monster with superpowers", Eiling "quite literally [...] embodies the ugliness of militarism". Eiling also serves as an example of the development of comics over the decades: While in the 1940s and 50s comic heroes were "unabashed patriots", in the figure of General Eiling from the 2000s they fight against a representative of a misunderstood patriotism that values the reputation of the nation-state higher than the lives of any number of civilians.

Markus Engelns gives a different characterization of Eiling based on the World War III comic arcs, in a later stage in the character's development: Eiling no longer has his function as a general, and has lost any discernable motive beyond fighting, which emphasizes his dangerousness even more.

References

Characters created by Cary Bates
Characters created by Pat Broderick
Comics characters introduced in 1987
DC Comics characters who can move at superhuman speeds
DC Comics characters with accelerated healing
DC Comics characters with superhuman senses
DC Comics characters with superhuman strength
DC Comics military personnel
DC Comics television characters
Fictional characters with immortality
Fictional characters with superhuman durability or invulnerability
Fictional generals
Fictional major generals
Fictional United States Army personnel
Suicide Squad members